Interstate 169 may refer to any of four currently designated or future highways which are or would be auxiliary routes of Interstate 69,

Currently designated
Interstate 169 (Kentucky), a highway along the former Pennyrile Parkway in Kentucky
Interstate 169 (Texas), a partially complete highway under construction near Brownsville, Texas

Future
Interstate 169 (Tennessee), a highway proposed between Martin and Union City, Tennessee
Interstate 169 (Indiana), a highway proposed to be re-numbered from the residual 2.4 miles of Interstate 164 in Indiana

1
69-1